Three-time defending champion Richard Sears defeated Howard Taylor in the challenge round, 6–0, 1–6, 6–0, 6–2 to win the men's singles tennis title at the 1884 U.S. National Championships. A challenge round was introduced this year, which was played until 1911. Arthur Rives became the first player to play at more than one Grand Slam singles tournament within a calendar year.

Draw

Challenge round

Finals

Earlier rounds

Section 1

Section 2

Section 3

Section 4

References 

 

Men's singles
1884